José Fernando Arbex Miró (28 May 1941 – 5 July 2003) was an influential Spanish musician and songwriter from Madrid, who enjoyed success both with his own groups and also with other artists.

While still in his teens, he was the drummer in Los Estudiantes, and in 1965 he formed the very successful pop band Los Brincos (often seen as the "Spanish Beatles") in which he also played drums. After that group split in the late 1960s, Arbex formed the progressive rock trio Alacran with Iñaki Egaña and Oscar Lasprilla. When Lasprilla left the band and moved to England, Arbex and Egaña founded the Latin disco and rock-orientated Barrabás, who went on to considerable European success throughout the 1970s. Their most successful hit single "Woman" found its way on to the charts in the United States.

Alongside his career as a musician, Arbex acted as a producer and songwriter for many successful acts, including Jose Feliciano, Harry Belafonte, Nana Mouskouri, Emilio Aragón, Miguel Bosé and Middle of the Road. He also recorded works outside the world of popular music.  He composed the original music for the first Spanish Musical "La Maja de Goya", and music for cinema and ballet.

In 2000, he reformed Los Brincos for an extremely successful special concert in A Coruña, and also recorded with a reformed Barrabás.

Fernando Arbex died in 2003 after a long illness.

External links
 

1941 births
2003 deaths
Musicians from Madrid
Spanish songwriters
Spanish drummers
20th-century Spanish musicians
20th-century drummers